The Department of the Arkansas was a territorial department of the United States Army during the American Civil War.

History
The Department of the Arkansas was created on January 6, 1864, to consist of Union occupied Arkansas, except Fort Smith. Fort Smith was merged into the Department of the Arkansas on April 17, 1864. 

It was co-extensive with the reconstitution of 7th Army Corps. Commanders were Frederick Steele (January 6, 1864 to December 22, 1864) and Joseph J. Reynolds (December 22, 1864 to August 1, 1865).

See also
 Army of Arkansas

References

1864 establishments in Arkansas
Arkansas in the American Civil War
Arkansas